Jeff Wilson is an American academic and serial startup entrepreneur. The pseudonym Professor Dumpster is based upon his role as part of 'The Dumpster Project', an educational and minimalist living experiment that transformed a trash dumpster into a fully sustainable home. Wilson lived in the dumpster over the course of the yearlong project.

Jupe
In 2020, Wilson launched Jupe, a flat-packed housing tech startup.

Kasita

Wilson was a Co-Founder and CEO at the startup company Kasita. Kasita builds micro smart homes that are capable of stacking. Kasita was named one of Fast Company's Most Innovative Companies and won a SXSW Interactive Innovation Award. Wilson has referred to Kasita as a holistic integrated product, rather than a house. In December 2018, Kasita was sold to a tiny house hotel company in Austin, Texas.

The Dumpster Project

Wilson is the Chairman and Founder of the 501(c)3 non-profit 'The Dumpster Project', a STEM educational experiment in which he moved into an empty dumpster and transformed it into a  environmentally sustainable home. The project has been featured in a variety of local and national news sources. The project won an HBCU Ford Corporation community sustainability grant and a $10,000 Home Depot 'Retool Your School' competition, but a Kickstarter crowd-funding campaign was cancelled a few days before the deadline when it did not reach its goal. The project has received its share of criticism, as commenters have likened the endeavor to "poverty tourism" and noted the self-promotional nature of Wilson's publicity. On August 4, 2014, after six months without electricity, the  project moved into the second phase, aiming to create what Wilson referred to as the 'Ultimate Studio Apartment'. Though Wilson moved out of the dumpster in February 2015 short of accomplishing the goal of building a fully functioning home, it remains on the college campus where Wilson worked and has become a rotating space for teachers and educators. On the first night of the new home school program, Austin's Blackshear Elementary Principal Betty Jenkins overnighted in the dumpster. Wilson claims that the dumpster experiment was the central inspiration for Wilson's creation of the startup company, Kasita.

"No Baggage" experiment
Together with freelance writer Clara Bensen, Wilson performed the 'travel experiment' "No Baggage", in which they traveled for 21 days through eight countries with no change of clothes shortly after meeting on a dating website. New Line Cinema has acquired the right to produce a feature film and hired Adam Brooks of Bridget Jones  to screen write the film based on a book from Perseus Books entitled 'No Baggage' by Bensen. American actress Shailene Woodley has been slated to play Bensen in the film.

99 Nights Couchsurfing experiment
Subsequent to moving out of the dumpster, Wilson launched a project entitled '99 Nights ATX'  in which he aimed to spend 99 nights in 99 different homes across Austin, gaining an up-close and intimate understanding of how Austinites relate to their home spaces. The project is in collaboration with writer Clara Bensen.

Academic Work
Wilson was formerly dean of the University College and an associate professor at Huston–Tillotson University in Austin, Texas. He did post-doctoral work at Harvard, holds a PhD in Environmental Science from the University of Canterbury and is the recipient of a University of Texas Systems' Regents' Outstanding Teaching Award, the largest monetary teaching award in the United States. Wilson has authored numerous publications in the environmental science field and has received funding from the National Science Foundation.

References

Year of birth missing (living people)
Living people
Place of birth missing (living people)
American businesspeople
Harvard University alumni
University of Canterbury alumni